Ellwyn R. Stoddard (born February 16, 1927) is Professor Emeritus of Sociology and Anthropology at the University of Texas at El Paso where he began teaching in 1965. He was born in Garland, Utah.

Stoddard is an expert on Mexican borderlands culture.  He wrote the Borderlands Sourcebook, Mexican Americans, Maquila: Assembly Plants in Northern Mexico as well as about 100 articles, chapters or books largely relating to Borderlands Culture.  Among other things, Stoddard has argued Maquilas are safer and give better benefits than other factories in the region.

Stoddard was the founder of the Association of Borderland Scholars.  He has been included in Who's Who in America

Stoddard is a member of the Church of Jesus Christ of Latter-day Saints.

Sources

UTEP bio of Stoddard
library thing listing
Open Library listing for Stoddard
Conrey Bryson. "Saints at the Pass" in Ensign, Dec. 1991.

American Latter Day Saints
University of Texas at El Paso faculty
American sociologists
1927 births
Possibly living people
People from Garland, Utah